Cymindis pallescens is a species of ground beetle in the subfamily Harpalinae. It was described by Jedlicka in 1963.

References

pallescens
Beetles described in 1963